Gaepo-dong Station is a station on the Bundang Line, a commuter rail service of Korail.

Vicinity
Exit 1: Gaepo Woosung APT, Complex 8
Exit 2: Sunkyung APT
Exit 3: Mido APT
Exit 4: Yangjeon Elementary School
Exit 5: Daegok Elementary School, Mido APT
Exit 6: Gaepo Jugong APT, Complex 5
Exit 7: Gyeonggi Girls' High School
Exit 8: Japanese School in Seoul

Seoul Metropolitan Subway stations
Metro stations in Gangnam District
Railway stations opened in 2003